The Memory Game is a psychological thriller by London journalists, Nicci Gerrard and Sean French,  under the pseudonym Nicci French. It was their first novel (followed by The Safe House) and originally published by William Heinemann in 1997.

Plot

The novel concerns the account of one Jane Martello, a middle aged woman undergoing divorce proceedings with her husband, and subsequently separating herself from a large and strong family she has known since her childhood. The intricate traditions of her family and the one she had married into begin to break down when the body of her sister-in-law, Natalie, is found buried in the garden, after over two decades. This startlingly close distance to the house leads to the revelation of the murderer being very close to the family after all. The revelation acts to bring down the family structure that for so long was unbalanced, but stable - such as Jane's father-in-law, Alan, an openly crude and sexist novelist having once frequently had relations outside his marriage (to the knowledge of the whole family) and other underlying tensions between family members.

Jane undergoes psychiatric counselling, as she revels in the mysterious circumstances of one of her best childhood friend's death, and already present forerunnings to what appear to be a mid-life crisis. She undergoes a memory exercise (that the book is named for) to unlock memories lost from the trauma of her friend's death. What she unlocks proves seemingly to be the key to the death of Natalie, but the validity of the memories become questionable with the serious allegations they lead to.

British thriller novels
1997 British novels
Novels by Nicci French
Novels about midlife crisis
Heinemann (publisher) books